Seraphino Antao (October 30, 1937 - September 6, 2011) was a runner from Kenya. He won two events at the 1962 Commonwealth Games, making him the first Kenyan athlete to win a gold medal at an international level. He is of Asian origin (specifically Goan from Chandor)
, from low altitude coastal city of Mombasa and was a sprinter, making him an atypical Kenyan athlete.

Early career 
Seraphino Antao grew up in Ganjoni and Makupa estates of Mombasa. He is a son of Diogo Manuel and Anna Maria and has six siblings and was the neighbour of the musician and double bass player Francisco Mendes. While at Goan High School he took several sports but inclined towards short distance running. In 1957 he broke the Kenyan 100 and 220 yards records.

He competed at the 1958 Commonwealth Games in Cardiff, Wales, but without much success. Two years later Antao competed at the 1960 Summer Olympics in Rome, Italy, where he reached 100 metres semi finals and 200 metres second round.

Commonwealth success and later career 
The 1962 Commonwealth Games in Perth, Western Australia marked the highest point of his career, when he won 100 and 220 yards gold medals. He was also member of the Kenyan 4 x 440 yards relay team which finished fifth. Other members of the relay team were Wilson Kiprugut, Kimaru Songok and Peter Francis. The same year he won two gold medals (100 and 220 yard) at the British AAA Championships, which he attended three times. He also won several gold medals at the East and Central African Championships.

Kenya had gained independence in December 1963 and Antao became the first Kenyan Olympic flagbearer at the 1964 Summer Olympics in Tokyo, Japan, but he was ill and did not perform as well as expected at the track. He reached the 200 metres second round but was eliminated in the heats of the 100 metres

After the Olympics, he retired from the sport and moved to London, England. In 2003 he made a rare visit to Kenya attending the 50th anniversary of Kenya Amateur Athletics Association (today Athletics Kenya). Seraphino Antao died on September 6, 2011, following a battle with cancer.

References

External links
 Pioneer in Athletics Seraphino Antao: a Champion

1937 births
Kenyan people of Indian descent
2011 deaths
Sportspeople from Mombasa
Kenyan male sprinters
Olympic athletes of Kenya
Athletes (track and field) at the 1960 Summer Olympics
Athletes (track and field) at the 1964 Summer Olympics
Commonwealth Games medallists in athletics
Commonwealth Games gold medallists for Kenya
Athletes (track and field) at the 1958 British Empire and Commonwealth Games
Athletes (track and field) at the 1962 British Empire and Commonwealth Games
Kenyan people of Goan descent
Medallists at the 1962 British Empire and Commonwealth Games